Gajapathinagaram is a census town in Vizianagaram district of the Indian state of Andhra Pradesh. It is located in Gajapathinagaram mandal of Vizianagaram revenue division. It is located on National Highway 26 between Vizianagaram and Ramabhadrapuram.

Demographics
The population in 1901 was 1,34,553, compared with 1,24,057 in 1891.

 India census, Gajapathinagaram had a population of 5,282. Males constitute 48% of the population and females 52%. Gajapathinagaram has an average literacy rate of 60%, higher than the national average of 59.5%: male literacy is 67%, and female literacy is 53%. In Gajapathinagaram, 11% of the population is under 6 years of age.

Gajapathinagaram mandal had a population of 56,054 in 2001. Males constitute 27,770 and females 28,284 of the population. The average literacy rate of the mandal population is 45%. Male literacy rate is 56% and that of females 34%.

There are 35 revenue villages and 28 panchayats in this mandal.

As it is centre for so many villages, it has several shops for clothing. It has shops like Venkata Gayatri, Lifestyle, Ayyappa Readymades, Reload Men's Wear (number 1), and Youth Trends.

Legislative Assembly
List of Members of Legislative Assembly:
1955 - Kusuma Gajapathi Raju and Gantyana Suryanarayana
1962 -Taddi sanyasinaidu and
1967 and 1972 - Penumatsa Sambasiva Raju
1978 and 1985 - Vangapandu Narayanappala Naidu
1983 - Jampana Satyanarayana Raju
1999 - Thadi Sanyasi Appala Naidu
1989, 1994 and 2004 - Padala Aruna
2009 - Botcha Appala Narasaiah
2014 - K A NAIDU
2019 - Botcha Appala Narasaiah

Education
The primary and secondary school education is imparted by government, aided and private schools, under the School Education Department of the state. The medium of instruction followed by different schools are English, Telugu.

References 

Census towns in Andhra Pradesh
Mandal headquarters in Vizianagaram district